The 1987 Labatt Brier, the Canadian men's curling championship, was held from March 8 to 15 at the Northlands Agricom in Edmonton, Alberta.

Russ Howard of Ontario defeated Bernie Sparkes of British Columbia to win his first Brier title.

Teams

Round-robin standings

Round-robin results

Draw 1

Draw 2

Draw 3

Draw 4

Draw 5

Draw 6

Draw 7

Draw 8

Draw 9

Draw 10

Draw 11

Draw 12

Draw 13

Draw 14

Draw 15

Playoffs

Semifinal

Final

Statistics

Top 5 player percentages
Round Robin only

Team percentages
Round Robin only

References

March 1987 sports events in Canada
Curling competitions in Edmonton
1987
1987 in Canadian curling
1987 in Alberta